Ronald Thompson (24 December 1921 – 1988) was an English professional footballer who played as an inside forward in the Football League for Rotherham United and York City, in non-League football for Wadsley Common and Gainsborough Trinity, and was on the books of Sheffield Wednesday without making a league appearance.

References

1921 births
Footballers from Sheffield
1988 deaths
English footballers
Association football forwards
Sheffield Wednesday F.C. players
Rotherham United F.C. players
York City F.C. players
Gainsborough Trinity F.C. players
English Football League players